Anthony Cartwright may refer to:

 Anthony Cartwright (cricketer) (born 1940), New Zealand cricket player
 Anthony Cartwright (writer) (born 1973), British novelist